(an abbreviation of  , referred to as fermented shark in English) is a national dish of Iceland consisting of a Greenland shark or other sleeper shark that has been cured with a particular fermentation process and hung to dry for four to five months. It has a strong ammonia-rich smell and fishy taste, making hákarl an acquired taste.

Fermented shark is readily available in Icelandic stores and may be eaten year-round, but is most often served as part of a þorramatur, a selection of traditional Icelandic food served at the midwinter festival þorrablót.

Consumption

Fermented shark contains a large amount of ammonia and has a strong smell, similar to that of many cleaning products. It is often served in cubes on toothpicks. Those new to it may gag involuntarily on the first attempt to eat it because of the high ammonia content. First-timers are sometimes advised to pinch their nose while taking the first bite, as the odor is much stronger than the taste. It is often eaten with a shot of the local spirit, a type of akvavit called brennivín.

Hákarl comes in two varieties: chewy and reddish glerhákarl (lit. "glassy shark") from the belly, and white and soft skyrhákarl (lit. "skyr shark") from the body.

Preparation
The meat of the Greenland shark is poisonous when fresh because of its high urea and trimethylamine oxide content. However, when properly processed, it may be consumed safely.

The traditional method begins with gutting and beheading a shark and placing it in a shallow hole dug in gravelly sand, with the cleaned cavity resting on a small mound of sand. The shark is then covered with sand and gravel, and stones are placed on top of the sand in order to press the fluids out of the body. The shark ferments in this fashion for six to twelve weeks, depending on the season. Following this curing period, the shark is cut into strips and hung to dry for several months. During this drying period, a brown crust will develop, which is removed prior to cutting the shark into small pieces and serving. The traditional preparation process may be observed at Bjarnarhöfn Shark Museum on Snæfellsnes.

The modern method is simply to press the shark's meat in a large plastic container, into which drain holes have been cut.

In popular culture

Chef Anthony Bourdain described fermented shark as "the single worst, most disgusting and terrible tasting thing" he had ever eaten.

Chef Gordon Ramsay challenged James May to sample three "delicacies" (Laotian snake whiskey, bull penis, and fermented shark) on The F Word. After eating fermented shark, Ramsay spat it out, but May was able to keep his down. May even offered to eat it again.

On an Iceland-themed Season-2 episode of Travel Channel's Bizarre Foods with Andrew Zimmern, Andrew Zimmern described the smell as reminding him of "some of the most horrific things I've ever breathed in my life", but said that the dish tasted much better than it smelled. He described the taste as "sweet, nutty and only faintly fishy". Nonetheless, he did note of fermented shark: "That's hardcore. That's serious food. You don't want to mess with that. That's not for beginners".

On a 2015 episode of Travel Man, Jessica Hynes and Richard Ayoade visited a Reykjavík restaurant and described the taste of hákarl as "awful", "like a jellied cube of ammonia", and "technically edible".

On a Season-5 final episode of Animal Planet's River Monsters, biologist and angler Jeremy Wade mentioned that the flesh "smells of urine" that has "a really strong aftertaste, it really kicks in. It really kicks in at the back of the throat after you take the first bite". He further stated that the meat was unlike anything that he had tried before and that it was similar to a very strong cheese but with a definite fish element.

Archaeologist Neil Oliver tasted hákarl in the BBC documentary Vikings as part of his examination of the Viking diet. He described it as reminiscent of "blue cheese but a hundred times stronger".

In his series Ainsley Eats the Streets, chef Ainsley Harriott was unable to tolerate the heavy ammonia taste and described it as "like chewing a urine-infested mattress".

In the Simpsons season 24 episode "The Saga of Carl", Homer threatens native Icelander Carl with the dish, saying, "Give us some answers or you'll get a mouthful of rotten shark fermenting in its own urine!", to which Carl exclaims, "No, no! Anything but the inedible, repulsive food of my native land!"

Effects
The Greenland shark takes 150 years to reach sexual maturity, with some sharks living up to 400 years. Due to this, hunting of the Greenland shark is unsustainable and is slowly leading to the potential extinction of the species. As the Greenland shark is the longest-living vertebrate in the world, it takes an enormous amount of time for native populations to recover, currently being listed as vulnerable by the IUCN, primarily due to the effects of bycatch. Associations, such as the Northwest Atlantic Fisheries Organization, an intergovernmental fishing science and management body, are calling for a ban of the hunting and killing of Greenland shark.

See also

References

External links
 
 Fermented shark prepared by an Icelandic cook on National Geographic
 Jo's Icelandic Recipes: How to prepare "Rotten" Shark: How to Prepare Rotten Shark
 "Nordics Like Fish" cartoon

Sharks
Fermented fish
Icelandic cuisine
Dried fish
National dishes